Melandaha is an upazila of Jamalpur District  in the Division of Mymensingh, Bangladesh.

Geography
It has 55,954 households and total area 239.65 km2. It is bounded by Islampur upazila on the north, Jamalpur sadar and Madarganj upazilas on the south, Jamalpur Sadar, Sherpur sadar and Islampur upazilas on the east, Madarganj and Islampur upazilas on the west.

Points of interest
 Gandhi Ashram and Freedom Struggle Museum
 Shah Kamal Mazar Sharif, Durmot

Administration
Melandaha Thana was formed on 21 May 1925 and it was turned into an upazila on 15 April in 1983.

Melandaha Upazila is divided into Melandaha Municipality and 11 union parishads: Adra, Char Banipakuri, Durmot, Fulkocha, Ghuserpara, Jhaughara, Kulia, Mahmudpur, Nangla, Nayanagar, and Shuampur. The union parishads are subdivided into 132 mauzas and 199 villages.

Education

There are 8 colleges in the upazila. They include Jahanara Latif Mohila College, Hazrabari Sirajul Haque Degree College (founded in 1976), and Melandaha Government College (1972). Sheikh Fazilatunnesa Mujib Fisheries College is being converted into Sheikh Fazilatunnesa Mujib University of Science & Technology.

The madrasa education system includes three Fazil and one Kamil madrasas.

See also
Upazilas of Bangladesh
Districts of Bangladesh
Divisions of Bangladesh

References

Upazilas of Jamalpur District